Colombia competed at the 2011 World Aquatics Championships in Shanghai, China between July 16 and 31, 2011.

Diving

Colombia has qualified 5 athletes in diving.

Men

Women

Swimming

Colombia qualified 5 swimmers.

Men

Women

Synchronised swimming

Colombia has qualified 9 athletes in synchronised swimming.

Women

References

Nations at the 2011 World Aquatics Championships
2011
World Aquatics Championships